Now That's What I Call Music! 26 may refer to at least three different Now That's What I Call Music! series albums.
 Now That's What I Call Music! 26 (UK series)
 Now That's What I Call Music! 26 (U.S. series)
 Now! The Biggest New Hits on One Album 26 (Canadian series)